The World Copper Agreement, signed March 28, 1935, was an agreement by mining companies that attempted to create a worldwide copper cartel. The agreement formally created the International Copper Cartel. Uniting African, South American and European producers, the agreement aimed to "bring about better conditions in the production, distribution and marketing of copper throughout the world outside of the United States" through curtailment of production. To supervise the implementation of the agreement and amend breaches of it, the agreement provided for the creation of a Control Committee of 5 members.

Signaturies to the agreement 
 TUnion Minière du Haut Katanga (Katanga, Belgian Congo)
 Rhokana Corporation (Zambia)
 Roan Antelope Copper Mines (Zambia)
 Chile Exploration Company (Chile)
 Andes Copper Mining (Chile)
 Greene Cananea Copper (Mexico)
 Braden Copper Company (Chile)

In addition to the above, the Compagnie Francaise de Mines de Bor and the Rio Tinto each had a right to have one representative attend (without vote) all meetings of the Control Committee, and to receive minutes of such meetings and copies of all Committee decisions.

External links 

 Text of the World Copper Agreement 
 Montero, J.-P. and Guzmán, J.I. Welfare-enhancing collusion in the presence of a competitive fringe
 Guzmán, J.I. Cooperation as a price stabilizing mechanism in mineral markets

Copper cartels
1935 in economics
1930s economic history